Bicyclus uniformis, the uniform bush brown, is a butterfly in the family Nymphalidae. It is found in Ivory Coast, Ghana, Cameroon, the Central African Republic, the eastern part of the Democratic Republic of the Congo, Uganda, north-western Tanzania and possibly Nigeria. The habitat consists of forests in good condition.

Adults are attracted to fermenting fruit.

References

Elymniini
Butterflies described in 1908